Tahua Municipality is the second municipal section of the Daniel Campos Province in the Potosí Department in Bolivia. Its seat is Tahua.

Geography 
Tahua Municipality lies in the Altiplano at the Uyuni salt flat.

Some of the highest mountains of the municipality are listed below:

 Ch'iyar Qullu
 Jisk'a Wat'a
 Lluqu Lluqu
 Muruq'u Qullu
 Wila Qullu
 Wila Wilani

Subdivision 
The municipality consists of the following cantons: 
 Ayque
 Cacoma
 Caquena
 Coqueza
 Tahua
 Yonza

The people 
The people are predominantly indigenous citizens of Aymara descent.

See also 
 Inkawasi Island
 Isla del Pescado

References

External links 
Tahua Municipality: population data and map

Municipalities of Potosí Department